Ineu (also Inău) is a peak in the Rodna Mountains, Romania with an elevation of .

Ineu Peak belongs to the Ineu–Lala Mixed Reservation, within the Rodna Mountains National Park.

References

Mountains of Romania
Mountains of the Eastern Carpathians